Stenny Kusuma (born 7 April 1986) is an Indonesian badminton player. He was part of the Indonesian junior team that won the bronze medal at the 2004 Asian Junior Championships in the boys' team event. Kusuma who played for the Suryanaga Surabaya club was hired by the Spanish Badminton Federation in 2006. After nine months in Spain, he was selected to join the national team, but due to a personal reason, he left the team and joined the Rinconada club in Seville. Kusuma was the men's doubles champion at the 2004 Pakistan Satellite and 2009 Portugal International tournament.

Achievements

BWF International Challenge/Series
Men's doubles

 BWF International Challenge tournament
 BWF International Series tournament

References

External links
 

1986 births
Living people
Sportspeople from Surabaya
Indonesian male badminton players
Spanish male badminton players
20th-century Indonesian people
21st-century Indonesian people